The F Niterói (F-40) is a Niterói-class frigate of the Brazilian Navy. The Niterói was the lead ship of her class ordered by the Brazilian Navy, on 20 September 1970. The Niterói was launched on 8 February 1974, and was commissioned on 20 November 1976.

History
Niterói’s first modernization was completed on December 8, 2005.

From April 22 to 17 July 2015, the ship was docked at Dique Seco Almirante Campbell de Barros, where various services were performed, such as the treatment and painting of living works and the replacement of side plates.

The Brazilian Navy informs that on September 8, 2018, there was a flooding in the Niterói while she was moored at the Naval Base in Rio de Janeiro, due to damage in a salt water network. The incident was promptly tackled by the ship’s service personnel, with the support of other Navy ships moored nearby. The situation was normalized, the ship being in its normal conditions of stability. There was no death or serious damage.

In 2019, Niterói was deactivated and discontinued due to high maintenance and preservation costs, given the vessel's time of use. On June 28 of the same year, the Frigate Disarmament Exhibition was held.

Gallery

External links 

 Decommissioning ceremony 
 Launching ceremony

References

Niteroi-class frigates
1974 ships
Ships built in Southampton
Frigates of the Cold War